Mile-a-Minute-Love is a 1937 American drama film written by Duncan Renaldo who also stars as phony Spanish Count Ribalto. The ersatz count steals a racing boat and swindles Wynne Drexel (Duncan) out of $100,000. When Bob (Bakewell) solves the crimes and gets Drexel's money back, she marries him.

Cast
Duncan Renaldo – Count Ribalto
William Bakewell – Bob
Arletta Duncan – Wynne Drexel

References

External links
 
 
 
 

1937 films
1930s English-language films
1937 drama films
American black-and-white films
American drama films
Films directed by Elmer Clifton
1930s American films